Mordechai Dov Brody (September 10, 1996 – November 4 or 15, 2008), nicknamed Motl or Motyl, was a 12-year-old Hasidic Jewish boy from Brooklyn, New York, United States.

After a brain tumor stopped his brain functioning, doctors declared him legally dead on November 4, 2008, but his parents refused to accept the legal definition of death on religious grounds because his heart was still beating. The case became the center of a widely publicized, but never resolved, legal dispute between his parents, Eluzer and Miriam Brody, and Children's National Medical Center, Washington, D.C.

Position of the hospital
According to an affidavit filed by one of his doctors, Brody's condition had deteriorated beyond a persistent vegetative state. He was pronounced brain dead and was unable to breathe on his own without the help of a ventilator. His heart beat on its own, but he required medication to maintain his blood pressure (normally a function of the brain stem). As a result, Brody's physicians wished to remove the boy from life support, as they believed he was brain dead, which is the legal definition of death in the District of Columbia.

Position of the parents
Although there is no consensus about what defines death in Jewish law, the parents are followers of rabbi Chaim Jacob Tauber, chief rabbinical judge of the Bobov Hasidic community in Brooklyn and they reject brain death as an indicator of death.  They wanted their son to remain on a ventilator as long as his heart was beating. As the case deals with the definition of death, rather than the value of living in a permanent vegetative state, it was far more like that of Jesse Koochin than that of Terri Schiavo.

Legal proceedings
The hospital asked Judge William Jackson of the Superior Court of the District of Columbia to affirm the doctors' decision that the boy could be taken off life support. Brody's parents challenged the hospital's assertion that Brody was dead, and claimed that doing so would be a violation of the Religious Freedom Restoration Act. The judge heard initial arguments on November 10, but delayed issuing a decision until further hearings could be held. The family and the hospital also released a joint statement where they expressed their mutual hope for an out of court decision.

Cardiac death
Brody's heart stopped on November 15, 2008, and he was buried on November 16. The state of New York ruled November 4 his date of death. The court case was never resolved.

Notes

References

Further reading
"The Brain Death Controversy in Jewish Law" by Rabbi Yitzchok A. Breitowitz for more on Judaism's view of brain death

1996 births
2008 deaths
People from Brooklyn
Jewish medical ethics
Medical controversies in the United States